Penicillium penarojense is a species of fungus in the genus Penicillium which was isolated from soil of the Colombian Amazon forest.

Further reading

References 

penarojense
Fungi described in 2011